Kim Eui-kon (born 24 January 1958) is a Korean former wrestler who competed in the 1984 Summer Olympics.

References

External links 
 

1958 births
Living people
South Korean male sport wrestlers
Olympic wrestlers of South Korea
Olympic bronze medalists for South Korea
Olympic medalists in wrestling
Wrestlers at the 1984 Summer Olympics
Medalists at the 1984 Summer Olympics
Asian Games medalists in wrestling
Asian Games bronze medalists for South Korea
Wrestlers at the 1978 Asian Games
Medalists at the 1978 Asian Games
20th-century South Korean people